Leszek Laszkiewicz (born August 11, 1978) is a Polish ice hockey player currently with JKH GKS Jastrzębie of the Polska Liga Hokejowa. He has also played for several other teams in different European leagues, including the Deutsche Eishockey Liga, Czech Extraliga and Italian Serie A. Laszkiewicz also played for the Polish national team, and appeared in eighteen consecutive Ice Hockey World Championship tournaments from 1998 until 2015, which was tied for third most in IIHF history at the time.

Career statistics

Regular season and playoffs

References

External links

1978 births
Living people
HC Havířov players
HC Milano players
HC Vítkovice players
MKS Cracovia (ice hockey) players
JKH GKS Jastrzębie players
KTH Krynica players
Nürnberg Ice Tigers players
People from Jastrzębie-Zdrój
Polish ice hockey left wingers
TH Unia Oświęcim players
Sportspeople from Silesian Voivodeship
KH Zagłębie Sosnowiec players
Polish expatriate ice hockey people
Polish expatriate sportspeople in the Czech Republic
Polish expatriate sportspeople in Germany
Polish expatriate sportspeople in Italy
Expatriate ice hockey players in the Czech Republic
Expatriate ice hockey players in Germany
Expatriate ice hockey players in Italy